is a former racing driver from Japan. After some experience in the Japanese lower formulae, he made an attempt at Formula One.

A deal to drive in the 1976 Japanese Grand Prix with the RAM team came to nothing, but Kuwashima found a seat with the then-struggling Wolf–Williams Racing, driving a Wolf–Williams FW05. He took part in the first practice session for the race, but proved rather slow. In any case, later that day his sponsors withdrew their financing of the Williams deal, and Frank Williams promptly replaced Kuwashima with Hans Binder for the second practice session and the race itself. Kuwashima was not to have another chance in Formula One, and he returned to the Japanese Formula 2000 and Formula Two series where he spent the rest of his career.

Complete Formula One results
(key)

External links
 Biography at F1 Rejects

1950 births
Living people
Japanese racing drivers
Japanese Formula One drivers
Wolf Formula One drivers
European Formula Two Championship drivers
20th-century Japanese people